Edward Harold Spender (22 June 1864 – 15 April 1926), was a British Liberal Party politician, author, journalist and lecturer.

Background
He was the son of Dr John Kent Spender and his wife Lillian Spender, and John Alfred Spender was his brother. He was educated at Bath College where he was Head Boy from 1882–83. Exhibitioner of University College, Oxford. 1st in Mods. 1884; 1st. in Lit. Hum. 1887; MA. Harold was a friend of David Lloyd George, with whom he went hiking, and travelled to Germany. He married, in 1904, Violet Hilda Schuster. They had three sons, Michael, Stephen, Humphrey and one daughter, Christine. His wife died in 1921. After his death Stephen and Christine were raised in Hampstead by a governess.

Professional career
He was on the staff of the Echo from 1887–89. He was Lecturer for Oxford University Extension Delegacy from 1889–92. He was on the staff of the Pall Mall Gazette from 1891–93, the Westminster Gazette from 1893–95, the Daily Chronicle from 1895–99, the Manchester Guardian from 1899–1900 and the Daily News from 1900–14. During the war he gave himself up to war savings propaganda, volunteering, and other war activities from 1914–18.

Political career
He was Liberal candidate for the Bath Division of Somerset at the 1922 General Election.

Family
He married Violet Hilda Schuster (1878–1921), daughter of Ernest Joseph Schuster (1850–1924), barrister, and his wife, Hilda Weber, daughter of Sir Herman Weber, a German-born doctor who became a naturalised British subject. Harold and Violet's children included the poet Stephen, the explorer Michael, and Humphrey Spender, a photojournalist and artist.

Publications
Story of the Home Rule Session, 1893 
At the Sign of the Guillotine, 1895
Through the High Pyrenees, 1898
The Arena, 1906
Home Rule, 1912
In Praise of Switzerland, 1912
The Call of the Siren, 1913
One Man Returns, 1914
The Flame of Daring, 1915
The Dividing Sword, 1916
The Man Who Went, 1919
A Briton in America, 1921
Byron and Greece, 1924
Men and Mansions, 1924
The Cauldron of Europe, 1925
He had published three biographies;
Herbert Henry Asquith, 1915
General Botha, 1916
 David Lloyd George, 1920

References

External links
 
 
 
 Portraits of Spender at the National Portrait Gallery: http://www.npg.org.uk/collections/search/person/mp76021/harold-spender

1864 births
1926 deaths
Alumni of University College, Oxford
British male journalists
Liberal Party (UK) parliamentary candidates